Harry Potter and the Deathly Hallows - Part 2 (Original Motion Picture Soundtrack) is a motion picture soundtrack to the 2011 film of the same name composed and conducted by Alexandre Desplat. The soundtrack was nominated for a Grammy Award, Satellite Award, Houston Film Critics Society Award, Denver Film Critics Society Award, and an IFMCA Award for Best Original Score for a Fantasy Film. The soundtrack won the San Diego Film Critics Society Award for Best Score.

Development
It was confirmed on the Warner Bros. website that Part 1 composer Alexandre Desplat would return to score Part 2. In an interview with Film Music Magazine, Desplat stated that scoring Part 2 is "a great challenge" and that he has "a lot of expectations to fulfil and a great deal of work" ahead of him. Desplat started writing the music in early 2011 and finished recording with orchestrators Conrad Pope, Jean-Pascal Beintus, Bill Newlin, Nan Schwartz, Clifford Tasner, Alejandro de la Llosa and the London Symphony Orchestra on 27 May 2011 at Abbey Road Studios, as stated on Pope's official Facebook page. Actress Evanna Lynch confessed in 2011's LeakyCon that she was invited to the scoring sessions, when Desplat was recording the music for the Gringotts sequence.

The main theme of the film, "Lily's Theme", was performed by Mai Fujisawa, daughter of Japanese composer Joe Hisaishi. In the film, several tracks are re-used from previous Harry Potter films, which are not included in the released soundtrack: a variant of "Hedwig's Theme"', originally composed by John Williams, which plays during a scene in Harry Potter and the Chamber of Secrets, is used twice in Part 2. The first time is when Harry, Ron, and Hermione meet with their friends in the Room of Requirement. Critics have claimed that this has added strongly to the deep, moving feelings made and the sense of hope given to the audience. The second time is when Snape is sent out of the castle, and the Order of the Phoenix takes over control. "Dumbledore's Farewell", composed by Nicholas Hooper for Harry Potter and the Half-Blood Prince, is used by Desplat in the track "Severus and Lily", which plays during the "Prince's Tale" sequence. A variant of Hooper's "The Kiss" from Harry Potter and the Order of the Phoenix also makes an appearance throughout the Hogwarts viaduct scene. The final scene of Part 2, set 19 years after the Battle of Hogwarts includes "Leaving Hogwarts", composed by Williams for the first film, followed by a suite of "Hedwig's Theme" for the end credits.

Desplat spoke of the use of Williams' themes in Part 2, saying, "Well, we all know there's one theme, which has become iconic, Hedwig's Theme from John Williams. This theme is crucial to the success of the story, and it would have been disrespectful and stupid for me not to use it at the crucial moments where we need to refer to these ten years of friendships that we've all had with these characters and kids, so Hedwig's Theme does reoccur a lot more [than] in Part 1 where loss of innocence was the main theme of the film [...]"

Critical reception

The soundtrack received critical acclaim. Jorn Tillnes of Soundtrack Geek gave the soundtrack a 9/10 and noted, "Part 2 ends in anything but tears. It is a joy to listen to just like Part 1 and using the Hedwig's Theme by John Williams, which is the ultimate Harry Potter theme after all, is a brilliant touch." Christian Clemmensen of Filmtracks gave the soundtrack an overall rating of 4/5, the music as heard on the album 3/5, and rated the score in the context of the film a 5/5, and commented, "Desplat finally proves that his style can transcend his obvious technical mastery of an orchestra and reach levels of tonal majesty that can be summed up in a single word: epic."

Danny Graydon from Empire Online gave the soundtrack a 5/5 rating, and said "Just as John Williams created Harry Potter musical language, Alexandre Desplat succeeds magnificently in completing it. Desplat crafts a highly emotional thematic anchor with its strings and solo vocalist."
Another review came from Allmusic.com; James Christopher Monger gave the soundtrack a 3/5 and commented, "Bombastic, sinister, and triumphant, the appropriately dark and apocalyptic Deathly Hallows, Pt. 2 may sit near the bottom of the Potter soundtrack pile, but it can hardly be called a failure." Later, a review came from Jonathan Broxton of Movie Music UK, who rated the score 5/5 stars, and commented, "I can't speak highly enough of Desplat's achievement in concluding the Harry Potter franchise the way he has..., Harry's story was always about death, and Desplat's decision to build his score around a musical motif representing those departed souls was a perfect one. This is one of the scores of the year." Evening Hour rated the soundtrack 4.5/5, commenting, "Desplat has proved to be a formidable force in the success of the Deathly Hallows films, seamlessly blending emotional nuance with action-packed grandeur. He has, in short, created a satisfying and richly layered aural landscape that I will always love coming back to."

Release
The soundtrack was released on 12 July 2011. Previews of the tracks were released on 23 June 2011.

Track listing
All tracks are composed, produced and conducted by Alexandre Desplat.

Credits and personnel
Personnel adapted from the album liner notes.

 Piers Adams – recorder
 John Barrett – assistant engineer
 David Barron – executive producer
 Jean-Pascal Beintus – orchestration
 Clive Bell – shakuhachi
 Paul Broucek – executive in charge of music
 Peter Clarke – music editor
 Paul Clarvis – ethnic percussion
 Peter Cobbin – mixing, producer, recording
 Charles Cole – choir master
 Alexandre Desplat – composer, conductor, flute, liner notes, orchestration, percussion, piano, producer
 Ninon Desplat – score coordinator
 Terry Edwards – choir master
 Xavier Forcioli – score coordinator
 Rebecca Gilliver – cello
 Mark Graham – music preparation
 David Heyman – executive producer
 Robert Houston – score editor
 Allan Jenkins – music editor
 Lewis Jones – Pro-Tools
 Jill Kemp – recorder
 Gabriella Kitto – soprano (vocal)
 Annabel Knight – recorder
 Carmine Lauri – concert master
 Jakob Lindberg – theorbo
 Jason Linn – executive in charge of music
 London Oratory – junior choir, chorus

 London Symphony Orchestra – orchestra
 London Voices – choir, chorus
 Mai Fujisawa - solo vocalist
 Sue Mallet – music contractor
 Lisa Margolis – music business affairs
 Gerard McCann – producer, supervising music editor
 Eoghan McNelis – soprano (vocal)
 David Miller – lute, theorbo
 Stuart Morton – music editor
 John Parricelli – guitar
 Patrick Phillips – assistant engineer
 Conrad Pope – producer, supervising orchestrator
 Paul Pritchard – assistant engineer
 Katie Reynolds – post production supervisor
 Sam Okell – mixing, recording
 Schola Cantorum of the Cardinal Vaughan Memorial School – choir, chorus
 Nan Schwartz – orchestration
 Sandeep Sriram – art direction
 Alison Stephens – mandolin
 Marc Stevens – music contractor
 Clifford Jay Tasner – orchestration
 Katie Trethewey – soprano (vocal)
 David Walter – MIDI programming
 Kirsty Whalley – score editor
 Subodh Chikhalkar – score editor
 Gaurav Nagarkatti – assistant score editor (assistant to Subodh Chikhalkar)
 John Williams – original composer of "Hedwig's Theme" and additional themes, including the unreleased cue "Epilogue (19 Years Later)", originally "Leaving Hogwarts" from Harry Potter and the Philosopher's Stone
 Nicholas Hooper - original composer of the cue "Dumbledore's Farewell" from Harry Potter and the Half-Blood Prince
 David Yates – executive producer, liner notes

Charts

References

07
2011 soundtrack albums
2010s film soundtrack albums
London Symphony Orchestra soundtracks
Fantasy film soundtracks
WaterTower Music soundtracks
Alexandre Desplat soundtracks